Kate & Koji is a British television sitcom produced by Hat Trick Productions for ITV. It was created and written by Andy Hamilton and Guy Jenkin. The show aired from 18 March 2020 to 13 April 2022. The series follows Kate (Brenda Blethyn), a working-class café owner in neglected coastal resort Seagate in south Essex, who develops a strong friendship with regular customer Koji (Jimmy Akingbola), an asylum-seeking doctor. For Series 2, Akingbola was replaced by Okorie Chukwu.

Plot
Kate (Brenda Blethyn) is a somewhat prickly, working-class woman who runs an old-fashioned café in neglected coastal resort Seagate in south Essex. She soon develops a strong but volatile friendship with regular customer Koji (Jimmy Akingbola in Series 1 and Okorie Chukwu in Series 2). After grilling him on why he doesn't spend any money, he reveals that he doesn't work; although he is a doctor, he is also an asylum-seeker. After word gets out, Koji becomes the unofficial general practitioner and holds 'surgery' in the café, racking up customers for Kate, who offers him free food to keep the scheme going.

Production 
The exterior of the seaside café was filmed at Frasiers Pie and Mash Shop in Herne Bay, standing in for the fictional seaside town of Seagate. The production also filmed exteriors of The Divers Arms pub and various scenes around the promenade and Herne Bay Pier and an exterior scene at Herne Bay industrial estate. A further sequence was shot on the promenade featuring a storm and its after effects.

Cast
 Brenda Blethyn as Kate Abbott, the owner of the cafe
 Jimmy Akingbola (Series 1) and Okorie Chukwu (Series 2) as Koji, an African asylum seeker doctor working in the cafe
 Blake Harrison as 'Medium' Dan, Kate's nephew who works as a decorator
 Barbara Flynn as Councillor Lavinia Bone, a snobbish council member and Kate's nemesis
 Victor McGuire as Mr Mullholland, a regular at the cafe
 Rosalind Ayres as Iris, another regular at the cafe
 Gary Lammin as The Postman

Cancellation
On 18 November 2022, ITV had announced Kate and Koji would not return for its third series due to a drop in ratings.

Series overview

Episodes

Series 1 (2020)

Series 2 (2022)

References

External links
 
 
 

2020 British television series debuts
2022 British television series endings
2020s British sitcoms
English-language television shows
Television series about immigration
ITV sitcoms
Television series by Hat Trick Productions
Television shows shot at BBC Elstree Centre
Television shows set in Essex
Television shows shot in Kent
Works about immigration to Europe